Esenbeckia delta is a species of fly in the family Tabanidae.

Distribution
United States, Mexico.

References

Tabanidae
Insects described in 1920
Diptera of North America